The Caribbean sharpnose shark (Rhizoprionodon porosus) is a requiem shark, and part of the family Carcharhinidae.

Distribution and habitat
It is found in the tropical waters of the western Atlantic Ocean and the Caribbean, between latitudes 28° N and 40° S, from the surface to a depth of 500 m.

Description
The life span is estimated to be about 8–10 years old.

Taxonomy
The species was once confused as being the same species as the Atlantic sharpnose shark - however difference in vertebra counts indicate that it is a separate species.

Breeding
Reproduction and litter size is similar to those of the Atlantic sharpnose shark.

References

External links

 
 http://www.flmnh.ufl.edu/fish/Gallery/Descript/CSharpnose/CSharpnose.html

Caribbean sharpnose shark
Viviparous fish
Fish of the Caribbean
Fish of the Dominican Republic
Caribbean sharpnose shark